R-6 regional road is a Montenegrin roadway.

It serves as a connection between Rožaje and Tutin, Serbia.

History

In January 2016, the Ministry of Transport and Maritime Affairs published bylaw on categorisation of state roads. Local road on this route was recategorised as R-6 regional road.

Major intersections

References

R-6